The 2014 Changchun Yatai F.C. season is Changchun's 9th consecutive season in the Chinese Super League. Changchun will also be competing in the Chinese FA Cup. Manager Šapurić was sacked for the second time by the club after a 2-3 loss to Guangzhou R&F on 20 April. His compatriot Okuka was appointed with a 1+1 contract 6 days later, and made his managerial debut for the club in a 1-3 loss against Harbin Yiteng on 4 May. 
Changchun officially stayed up after a 1-1 draw against Hangzhou Greentown in the final game but did not go through the season with many relegation fears. The iconic moment of their 2014 season was that they beat league giant Guangzhou Evergrande home and away, became only the second Chinese team to achieve that, after Guangzhou R&F in 2012.

Competitions

Chinese Super League

League table

Matches

References

External links
Official Site 

Changchun Yatai F.C. seasons
Changchun Yatai F.C.